Hellinsia cristobalis is a moth of the family Pterophoridae. It is found on the Galapagos Islands.

The antennae have longitudinal dark brown and white stripes on a basal dark brown ground colour. There are scales on the thorax, these are basally beige, apically greyish brown and white laterally at the apex. The forewings are mostly have basally pale brown and apically darker brown scales, irrorated with pure white scales. The Hindwings and their fringes are greyish brown.

Adults have been recorded in February, November and possibly December.

References

Moths described in 1992
cristobalis
Pterophoridae of South America
Endemic fauna of the Galápagos Islands
Moths of South America